Found A Place is the fifth studio album by FFH. The album peaked at #154 on the Billboard 200.

Track listing
"When I Praise" (Jeromy Deibler) - 3:48
"Found a Place" (Michael Boggs) - 3:36
"Why Do I" (Jeromy Deibler) - 4:37
"Lord Move, or Move Me" (Jeromy Deibler) - 5:00
"Daniel" (Michael Boggs) - 3:16
"Your Love is Life to Me" (Jeromy Deibler, Tony Wood) - 3:36
"Because of Who You Are" (Jeromy Deibler) - 3:30
"Be My Glory" (Dukes Jason Cristoffer) - 3:02
"I'm Not Afraid to Love You" (Jeromy Deibler, Tony Wood) - 4:03
"It's Been a Long Time" (Jeromy Deibler) - 4:03
"Every Now and Then" (Jeromy Deibler, Michael Boggs) - 4:36

Personnel 

FFH
 Jeromy Deibler – vocals
 Jennifer Deibler – vocals
 Brian Smith – vocals
 Michael Boggs – vocals, acoustic guitar

Musicians
 Jeffrey Roach – keyboards (1)
 Bryon Hagan – keyboards (2-11)
 Glenn Pearce – electric guitars (1-7, 9, 10, 11), acoustic guitar (3)
 Jerry McPherson – additional electric guitar (1), electric guitars (8)
 David Cleveland – acoustic guitar (6)
 Matt Pierson – bass (1, 8)
 Craig Young – bass (2-7, 9, 10, 11)
 Scott Williamson – drums, percussion (1-10)
 Steve Brewster – additional drums (8)
 Eric Darken – percussion (11)
 Dave Williamson – string arrangements (4)
 Carl Gorodetzky – string contractor (4)
 The Nashville String Machine – strings (4)
 John Catchings – cello (11)

Handclaps on "Be My Glory"
 Christine Amerman, Katie Kelsey, Brittany Mitchell, Jameson Reeder, Allyson Smith and FFH.

Production 
 Producer – Scott Williamson
 Executive Producers – Robert Beeson and Bob Wohler
 Engineers – Jullian Kindred, Randy Poole and Salvo.
 Vocals and Overdubs recorded by Scott Williamson
 Additional Engineers – Kent Hooper and Doug Sarrett
 Assistant Engineers – Robert "Void" Caprio, Alex Chan, Grant Cibula, Mike Elsner, Scott Giles, Grant Greene, Rick Hackley, Carissa Kaberline, Alan Litten and Chris Mara.
 Recorded at Bulldog Studio (Franklin, TN); Uno Mas Studio (Brentwood, TN); Quad Studios (Nashville, TN).
 Tracks 1–4, 7, 9 & 10 mixed by Tom Laune at Bridgeway Studios (Nashville, TN).
 Tracks 5, 6, 8 & 11 mixed by Salvo at Recording Arts (Nashville, TN).
 Mastered by Hank Williams at MasterMix (Nashville, TN).
 A&R Administration – Michelle Pearson 
 Artist Development – Jordyn Thomas 
 Art Direction – Nina Williams 
 Design – Michelle Kapp at Axis Media.
 Photography – Tony Baker 
 Stylist – Chad Curry 
 Hair and Makeup – Melissa Schleicher

References

External links 
FFH
Essential Records

FFH (band) albums
2000 albums
Essential Records (Christian) albums